Mohammad Khorram (born 7 February 1997 in Qazvin) is an Iranian football player who plays as midfielder for the Persian Gulf Pro League club Tractor.

References

External links
 

1997 births
Living people
Iranian footballers
Gostaresh Foulad F.C. players
Association football defenders
People from Qazvin